Doris Boaduwaa is Ghanaian professional footballer who plays for Ghana Women's Premier League Club Hasaacas Ladies and the Ghana Women's National Team. In 2022, she was nominated for Interclub Player of the Year (Women), Player of the Year (Women) and Young Player of the Year (Women) at the 2022 CAF Awards.

Honours 
Hasaacas Ladies

 Ghana Women's Premier League (GWPL): 2020–21
 Ghana Women's Special Competition: 2019
 Ghana Women's FA Cup: 2021
 WAFU Zone B Tournament: 2021
 CAF Women's Champions League runner-up: 2021

References 

2002 births
Living people
Ghanaian women's footballers
Women's association football midfielders
Hasaacas Ladies F.C. players

External links 

 
 Doris Boaduwaa on Twitter